Jale Aylanç (23 March 1948 – 7 July 2020) was a Turkish stage and film actress.

Aylanç died on 7 July 2020, aged 72. One day later, she was buried at Karşıyaka Cemetery in Ankara.

Awards
 Sanat Kurumu, 1990, Theater Honor Award
 5th , 2000, Honor Award

Theatre
 Yer Demir Gök Bakır : (Yaşar Kemal) - Ankara Sanat Tiyatrosu - 1992
 Ayak Takımı Aarasında : (Maksim Gorki) - Ankara Sanat Tiyatrosu - 1990
 Mefisto : Klaus Mann - Ankara Sanat Tiyatrosu - 1989
 Yusuf ile Menofis : Nâzım Hikmet - Ankara Sanat Tiyatrosu - 1989
 Sonuncular : Maksim Gorki - Ankara Sanat Tiyatrosu - 1987
 Silahşörün Gölgesi : Sean O'Casey - Ankara Sanat Tiyatrosu - 1987
 Bu Zamlar Bana Karşı : Yılmaz Onay - Ankara Sanat Tiyatrosu - 1986
 Nafile Dünya : Oktay Arayıcı - Ankara Sanat Tiyatrosu - 1985
 Bir Ceza Avukatının Anıları : (Faruk Eren)  - Ankara Sanat Tiyatrosu - 1984
 Bir Şehnaz Oyun : (Turgut Özakman - Ankara Sanat Tiyatrosu - 1984
 Galile'nin Yaşamı : Bertolt Brecht - Ankara Sanat Tiyatrosu - 1983
 Yaz Misafirleri : Maksim Gorki - Ankara Sanat Tiyatrosu - 1982
 Oyun Nasıl Oynanmalı : Vasıf Öngören - Ankara Sanat Tiyatrosu - 1979
 Tak-Tik : Bertolt Brecht - Ankara Sanat Tiyatrosu - 1978
 Akıllı Hayvanlar : Ahmet Tünel - Ankara Sanat Tiyatrosu - 1977 
 Komün Günleri : Bertolt Brecht - Ankara Sanat Tiyatrosu - 1976
 Nereye Payidar : Bilgesu Erenus - Ankara Sanat Tiyatrosu - 1975
 Dimitrof : Hedda Zinner  - Ankara Sanat Tiyatrosu - 1974
 Ana: Maksim Gorki - Ankara Sanat Tiyatrosu - 1974
 El Kapısı : Bilgesu Erenus - Ankara Sanat Tiyatrosu - 1972
 Evler Evler : İsmet Küntay - Ankara Sanat Tiyatrosu - 1972

Films
 Dengi Dengine - 2019
 Olur Olur - 2014
 Yeşil Deniz - 2014
 Rüzgarlı Sokak - 2013
 Suskunlar - 2012
 Türkan - 2010
 Gece Sesleri- 2008
 Beni Unutma - 2008 
 Nazlı Yarim - 2007 
 Hayat Türküsü - 2006 
 Fırtına - 2006 
 İnsan Kurdu - 1997 
 Tersine Akan Nehir - 1996 
 Düttürü Dünya - 1988 
 Kırlangıç Fırtınası - 1985

References

1948 births
2020 deaths
Burials at Karşıyaka Cemetery, Ankara
20th-century Turkish actresses
21st-century Turkish actresses
Turkish film actresses
Turkish stage actresses